This is a list of settlements in the Chania regional unit, Greece.

 Afrata
 Agia Marina
 Agia Roumeli
 Agia
 Agia Eirini
 Agios Ioannis
 Alikampos
 Alikianos
 Amygdalokefali
 Anopoli
 Anoskeli
 Aptera
 Armenoi
 Aroni
 Asfendos
 Asi Gonia
 Askyfou
 Chairethiana
 Chania
 Chora Sfakion
 Chordaki
 Chrysavgi
 Daratsos
 Deliana
 Drakona
 Drakona
 Drapanias
 Elos
 Emprosneros
 Epanochori
 Episkopi
 Faleliana
 Fournes
 Fres
 Fylaki
 Galatas
 Gavalochori
 Georgioupoli
 Gerani
 Glossa
 Gramvousa
 Impros
 Kaina
 Kakodiki
 Kakopetros
 Kalamitsi
 Kalamitsi
 Kalathenes
 Kallergiana
 Kaloudiana
 Kalydonia
 Kalyves
 Kamisiana
 Kampanos
 Kampoi
 Kampos
 Kandanos
 Karanos
 Kares, Apokoronas
 Kares, Platanias
 Kastellos
 Kefalas
 Kefali
 Kissamos
 Kokkino Chorio
 Kolymvari
 Kontomari
 Kontopoula
 Koufos
 Koukounara
 Koulkouthiana
 Kounoupidiana
 Kournas
 Kyparissos
 Lakkoi
 Lousakies
 Machairoi
 Malathyros
 Malaxa
 Maleme
 Manoliopoulo
 Maza
 Melidoni
 Meskla
 Modi
 Mournies
 Mouzouras
 Neo Chorio, Apokoronas
 Neo Chorio, Platanias
 Neriana
 Nerokouros
 Nipos
 Nochia
 Ntere
 Omalos
 Orthouni
 Paidochori
 Palaia Roumata
 Palaiochora
 Panethimos
 Pappadiana
 Patsianos
 Pemonia
 Perivolia, Kissamos
 Perivolia, Theriso
 Pervolakia
 Plaka
 Platanias
 Platanos
 Platyvola
 Plemeniana
 Polemarchi
 Polyrrinia
 Potamida
 Prases
 Psathogiannos
 Ramni
 Ravdoucha
 Rodopos
 Rodovani
 Rokka
 Sarakina
 Sasalos
 Sellia
 Sempronas
 Sfakopigadi
 Sirikari
 Sirili
 Skafi
 Skaloti
 Skines
 Sklavopoula
 Souda
 Sougia
 Spilia
 Stalos
 Sternes
 Strovles
 Stylos
 Tavronitis
 Temenia
 Theriso
 Topolia
 Tsikalaria
 Tzitzifes
 Vafes
 Vamos
 Vamvakopoulo
 Varypetro
 Vasilopoulo
 Vathi
 Vatolakkos
 Vlacheronitissa
 Vlatos
 Vothiana
 Voukolies
 Voulgaro
 Voutas
 Vouves
 Vryses
 Vryses
 Xamoudochori
 Xirosterni
 Zounaki
 Zympragou

By municipality

Gavdos

See also
List of towns and villages in Greece

 
Chania